Stone Mountain is the centerpiece of Stone Mountain State Park. It is a dome of exposed granite (specifically a quartz diorite to granodiorite) of Devonian age, which has intruded into the gneiss of the Precambrian Alligator Back Formation. It rises sharply over 600 feet (183 m) above the surrounding terrain. The mountain, which has an elevation of 2,305 feet (706 m) above sea level, is known for its barren sides and distinctive brown-gray color, and can be seen for miles. The mountain offers some of the best rock climbing in North Carolina, and the park's creeks and streams feature excellent brook trout fishing.

Because the mountain is the best example of a monadnock in massive granite in North Carolina it was designated a National Natural Landmark in May 1974.

References

Mountains of North Carolina
Landforms of Alleghany County, North Carolina
Landforms of Wilkes County, North Carolina
National Natural Landmarks in North Carolina
National Park Service areas in North Carolina
Inselbergs of Piedmont (United States)